Orapa is a genus of cicadas in the family Cicadidae, found in tropical Africa. About five described species are in Orapa. Orapa is the only genus of the tribe Orapini.

Species
These five species belong to the genus Orapa:
 Orapa africana Kato, 1927
 Orapa elliotti (Distant, 1907)
 Orapa lateritia Jacobi, 1910
 Orapa numa (Distant, 1904)
 Orapa uwembaiensis Boulard, 2012

References

Further reading

 
 
 
 
 
 
 
 
 

Cicadinae
Cicadidae genera